The second season of Gidi Up was originally aired on Ndani TV from 23 June 2014 through 29 September 2014. The season which has twelve episodes, directed by Jadesola Osiberu, is set in Lagos, Abuja and Calabar, and continues to follow the lives of "four socialites as they strive to make it in a world that is anything but fair".

The first season of the series was produced as a web series of no longer than ten minutes per episode. The second season however has a length of thirty minutes per episode and is being broadcast on television, with all episodes of season 1 re-edited and combined as a 52-minute pilot episode for season two on television. Other changes made in the second season include the change in cast members who played the characters of Obi, Eki and Sharon in season 1. Gidi Up premiered on cable television on 13 July 2014, with plans to go on terrestrial broadcast very soon.

Plot summary
Obi (OC Ukeje) is hijacked by his creditor, who snatched his car and gadgets as a payment for Obi's debt with him. Obi is taken to the hospital by Illa (Iretiola Doyle), who also paid for his expensive hospital bill; Obi eventually becomes Illa's Gigolo. After finding out about Illa's illegal ventures, Obi grows cold feet and tries to pull out of the relationship, and he ends up getting kidnapped.

Yvonne (Somkele Iyamah) lies to the police that Folarin (Daniel Effiong) is her boyfriend, and that what happened between them was a minor misunderstanding; this statement leads to the release of Folarin from the police custody. Sharon (Adesua Etomi), Chief Jagun’s daughter offers to go into business with Yvonne to start "Vone" all over again, which had crumbled along with Yvonne’s breakup with Chief Jagun. Yvonne is initially resistant towards the development, but she eventually accepts when Sharon reveals to her that she is aware of her relationship with her dad. However, rivalry often occurs between both parties in the business' decision making. Yvonne develops feelings for Meka (Anthony Monjaro), Yvonne's fiance, who has always felt that he is dating Sharon out of obligation and not love. Both eventually get much involved with each other, and Meka's wedding with Sharon is called off.

Tokunbo (Deyemi Okanlawon) starts up his company, "Techserve", with the help of some investors. Through his nonchalant attitude, he is unable to conclude his beta test at the deadline given. The investors however extended the deadline period, but this was hampered by Folarin, who is now into politics, and through his power shuts down Techserve in revenge for Yvonne. Tokunbo's father eventually sees reasons with his son and decides to invest in Techserve; he is however killed on his way home from Tokunbo's house.

Tokunbo's relationship with Eki (Titi Sonuga) at start looks good, but goes downhill after Tokunbo launches his business and he gets involved with Ify (Yvonne Ekwere). Eki gets pregnant, but Tokunbo strongly wants an abortion. Eki does his will and subsequently requests for a break. Though Tokunbo later apologises, Eki finds comfort in the arms of Mo (Ikechukwu Onunaku), who becomes her best friend and helps Eki in achieving her dreams.

Cast and characters
There was a change in the actors playing certain characters in season two. OC Ukeje replaced Karibi Fubura for the Obi character, Titi Sonuga replaced Oreka Godis for Eki, while Adesua Etomi replaced KC Ejelonu for the role of Sharon. This is Titi Sonuga's first acting experience; she attended the audition mainly to catch her fun, but ended up being selected.

Main characters
 OC Ukeje as Obi (12 episodes)
Deyemi Okanlawon as Tokunbo Adepoju (12 episodes)
Somkele Iyamah as Yvonne (12 episodes)
Titi Sonuga as Eki (12 episodes)

Supporting characters
Adesua Etomi as Sharon Olaitan Jagun (10 episodes)
Anthony Monjaro as Meka (10 episodes)
Daniel Effiong as Folarin (9 episodes)
Makida Moka as Monye (8 episodes)
Iretiola Doyle as Illa (7 episodes)
Demi Olubanwo as Yemi (7 episodes)
Ikechukwu Onunaku as Mo (5 episodes)
Ifeanyi Dike as Fred (4 episodes)
Isio Wanogho as Bibi (4 episodes)
Sharon Ooja as Jola (4 episodes)
Aderonke Adebanjo as Roslyn (3 episodes)
Taiwo Familoni as Segun (3 episodes)
Abiodun Kassim as Charles (1 episode)
Udoka Oyeka as Creditor (1 episode)
Sean Amadi as Derrick (1 episode)

Guest stars
Najite Dede as Ade (4 episodes)
 Jide Kosoko as Commissioner Olaitan (3 episodes) 
Yvonne Ekwere as Ify (3 episodes)
 Bimbo Manuel as Chief Jagun (2 episodes)
Akin Lewis as Senator Deji (2 episodes)
Joke Silva as Chief (Mrs) Adepoju (1 episode)
Keppy Ekpeyong Bassey as Chief Jagun's friend (1 episode)
 Mai Atafo as Mai Atafo (1 episode)
Ifeoma Fafunwa as Mrs Jagun (1 episode)
Ayo Lijadu as Tokunbo's father (1 episode)

Production
Due to the positive response received from the audience after the conclusion of season 1 of Gidi Up, the producers decided to make a second season that's bigger than the first season; It was decided to make it longer and also planned to be broadcast on television. As a result, more attention was paid to costuming, styling and other production aspects and details. Actors were taken to a remote camp in Osun State, outside Lagos for rehearsals before the commencement of principal photography.  Gidi Up Season 2 was filmed in Lagos for a period of three months. On the decision to air on TV, associate producer Kemi 'Lala' Akindoju commented: "In every work of art, you want as many people as possible to see it, you would not want it to be restricted".

Music and soundtrack
The series features independently produced music. The music selection is done by Tajudeen Opebiyi.

Track listing

Music reception
The music selection and score of Gidi Up has often been commended by music critics. Demola OG of NotJustOk comments: "Gidi Up is not just a show about love, failures, successes and heartaches; It's a show about love, failures, successes and heartaches, loaded with contemporary jams and that surreal 'sound of Lagos' you wouldn't find anywhere else. Gidi Up keeps it fresh with smashing jams and of course, a soothing soundtrack to go with it. So, whether you are getting down to Muna's "No Tomorrow" or letting your suspicions rise to Pucado's "Impostor"; one thing's for sure, sonically, Gidi Up is sound". Eromo Egbejule comments: "Throughout the series, it is so easy to note that the catalogue employed in making the music choices is as large in depth as it is lovely in execution. Variety is the spice of life and the afterlife and adds an extra layer to every story, including this one".

Promotions
Gidi Up Season 2 was officially announced on BellaNaija on 28 May 2014. Behind the scenes documentary video for the season was released on 11 June 2014. Official poster and character posters  were also released to the public on 13 June 2014. A private screening was held for first five episodes of the season on 21 June 2014 at the Genesis Deluxe Cinema, Lekki, ahead of its official release on 23 June.

Reception

Critical reception
The first half of the season has been met with generally positive reviews; most critics noted that the actors' performances and the storyline have improved significantly from the previous season. Nollywood Reinvented commended the changes made to the second season, cited Folarin (played by Daniel Effiong) as the standout character and concluded: "Gidi Up is more than a superficial drama because laced within all the Lagos heat, it also brings to the surface relevant societal issues," "The show brings the laughs. It has amazing cameos, and genius script twists that it keeps you interested for long enough". Ghana Celebrities comments: "The writers paint a picture that's relatable to the audience", "No matter what caste or class you find yourself in, whether a socialite in Lagos or a pauper in the slums of Nima-Ghana, these are themes you can identify with".  "It Moves at a logical step yet keeps the audience in a constant state of suspense and anguish; the audience's emotions is kept in a state of constant flux, making the slightest change in the fortunes of our protagonists keenly felt". It praised the acting, music and costume, concluding: "Moving at a pace reminiscent of all time classics like The Wire or Game of Thrones,  Gidi Up keeps you immersed in the story to the extent that you often find yourself asking where the last half hour went". CherryChatter commends the character development, music and states: "…the series captures the face of new Lagos; paying homage to the 'new' career paths, articulating the angst and generally lending itself to defining who the new Lagosian is". "Lagos was presented as such a beautiful and vibrant city; the director's ability to capture the essence of contemporary Lagos was completely spot on - It showed a Lagos I was familiar with". Idara Owodiong-Idemeko of Culture Custodian commended the choice of soundtrack, but faulted the sound mixing, She gave a rating of 8.8 out of 10 stars and concluded by stating: "Jadesola Osiberu has birthed real life characters that are relatable in every way. Attractive as they are, they are heavily flawed, imperfect, fragmented and highly ambitious just like the rest of us. They want it all and they want it now and that makes for a great plot and complex characters, which ultimately culminate in giving us a fantastic series". Teefah Rozay commends the costume design and concludes: "Aside a teeny bit of over acting from a few of the secondary cast members, Gidi Up is an excellent production! It’s a well-acted sexy drama, with a relatable story line and lust worthy fashion to boot…definitely worth watching!

Accolades
Gidi Up was nominated for the category "Best TV/web series" at the 2014 Nollywood Movies Awards, but however lost to Tinsel. Iretiola Doyle has also been nominated in three categories at the 2015 Africa Magic Viewers Choice Awards.

Episodes

References

2014 Nigerian television seasons
Gidi Up